Townsville Grammar School is an independent, co-educational, day, International Baccalaureate and boarding school, located in Townsville.

Established in 1888, it is the northernmost member of the Queensland grammar schools. From its foundation  the school   encouraged a co-educational environment, but in its early decades the number of female students was particularly small;  in its foundation year  (1888), "20 boys" are recorded as being enrolled. During World War II the school was acquired by the Royal Australian Air Force for use as barracks accommodation for the No. 3 Fighter Sector RAAF.

School badge
The School Badge was designed in 1902 by a Sydney architect. The background represents the Southern Cross, with the Three Turrets set on the Rock of Christianity, surrounded by the sea of Plenty. The central turret symbolises spiritual values, while the two side turrets represent intellectual and sporting values.

The Latin text on the badge reads "Bonus intra melior exi", literally "Come in good, go out better".

Headmasters

P. F. Rowland is as of 2018 the longest serving headmaster, holding his position for 34 years. During his time,"Boss" Rowland taught the School's two Rhodes Scholars, Chester Parker and George Hall.

Campuses

North Shore
The Junior School North Shore campus teaches from pre-kindy (for children turning 3 before 30 June).
This campus opened in 2015, and continues to grow.

Annandale
The Junior School Annandale campus teaches from pre-preparatory (for children turning 4 before 30 June) to grade 6.
This campus opened in 1997.

North Ward
The North Ward campus is situated in the seaside suburb of North Ward in Townsville. It comprises the Middle School (grades 7-9) and Senior School (grades 10-12). The School House building is now heritage-listed.

Sporting houses
The four sporting houses are named after former headmasters:
 Rowland - Red colour
 Miller - Blue colour
 Hodges - Green colour
 Whight - Purple colour

Notable alumni
 Karen Andrews, politician, current member of parliament for McPherson
 Charles Davidson, politician and former Postmaster-General & Minister for the Navy
 Harriet Dyer, actress
 Jarrod Harbrow, AFL footballer
 Ted Harding, politician and rugby league player
 Remy Hii, actor
 Harold Lowes, lawyer and politician
 Micheal Luck, professional rugby league player
 Agnes McWhinney, first female solicitor in Australia
 Greg Norman, former Number 1 ranked golfer
 Frederick Perkins, teacher, headmaster and minister
 Douglas Reye, pathologist, first to study and namesake of Reye syndrome
 Tia-Clair Toomey, world Crossfit champion and Australian weightlifting Olympist.

See also
 List of schools in Queensland

References

External links

 Townsville Grammar School Official Website

Boarding schools in Queensland
Private schools in Queensland
Junior School Heads Association of Australia Member Schools
Educational institutions established in 1888
Schools in Townsville
Queensland in World War II
1888 establishments in Australia